Jackson Township is one of nine townships in Fayette County, Indiana. As of the 2010 census, its population was 1,524 and it contained 615 housing units.

History
Jackson Township was established in 1820 from land given by Columbia Township. It was named for General and afterward President Andrew Jackson.

Geography

Unincorporated towns
 Everton

Adjacent townships
 Jennings Township (northeast)
 Harmony Township, Union County (east)
 Blooming Grove Township, Franklin County (southeast)
 Laurel Township, Franklin County (southwest)
 Columbia Township (west)
 Connersville Township (northwest)

Major highways
 Indiana State Road 1

Cemeteries
The township contains the following cemeteries: Maize Elliott Farm Cemetery, Everton Cemetery, 
Green Family Cemetery, Ireland Church Cemetery, Sarah and John Lee Farm Cemetery, Mt. Zion Cemetery, Myers-Brumfiel Cemetery, Old Parrot or Marvin Rose Cemetery, Poplar Ridge Cemetery, 
Union or Old Smallwood Cemetery

References
 
 United States Census Bureau cartographic boundary files

External links
 Indiana Township Association
 United Township Association of Indiana

Townships in Fayette County, Indiana
Townships in Indiana